The Freedom Party  was a political party in Indonesia.  It was established in 2002 as a reaction to the disappointment felt by several economic activists to the failure of the new Indonesian parties established after the end of the New Order regime to make meaningful changes to the political system. Rather than fighting for political aims, the party focus is on bringing about a people's economy. The three main principles of the party were nationhood, rule by the people and independence.

In the 2004 legislative election, the party won 0.7% of the popular vote and no seats. After initially failing to qualify, following a lawsuit it contested the 2009 elections, but came last, winning only 0.11% of the popular vote, from the electoral threshold of 2.50% and for the second time, no seats. Following its poor result in the 2009 vote, the party joined nine other smaller parties to form the National Unity Party.

References

2002 establishments in Indonesia
Defunct political parties in Indonesia
Political parties established in 2002
Pancasila political parties
Political parties with year of disestablishment missing